Tesma fractifascia is a moth in the subfamily Arctiinae. It was described by George Hampson in 1918. It is found in Cameroon, Nigeria and Uganda.

References

Moths described in 1918
Lithosiini